The Weedkiller's Daughter (1993) is the second album from John & Mary.

The Weedkiller's Daughter was produced by John Lombardo and Armand John Petrie and, like their first album Victory Gardens, features 10,000 Maniacs members Rob Buck and Jerry Augustyniak. Other contributors include Alex Chilton (Box Tops, Big Star), Canadian singer-songwriter Mary Margaret O'Hara, Bob Wiseman (Blue Rodeo), and English folk-guitar legend Martin Simpson.

The tracks "Angels of Stone" and "Cemetery Ridge" were songs that John Lombardo wrote during the last year he was part of 10,000 Maniacs. Cemetery Ridge was formerly known as "Thompson's March."

Track listing
All tracks composed by John Lombardo and Mary Ramsey except where indicated
"Two Worlds Parted" – 3:04
"Angels of Stone" – 4:38
"Your Return" – 3:09 
"Clare's Scarf" – 3:44
"Cemetery Ridge" – 3:09 
"A Nightfall" – 3:44 
"I Wanted You" (Hudson, Ford) – 2:30
"One Step Backward" – 3:49
"Fly Me To the North" (Marian Segal) – 4:24
"Clouds of Reason" – 4:24
"Maid of the Mist" (Mary Ramsey) – 1:50
"The Poor Murdered Woman" (Traditional) – 3:43

Personnel
John & Mary
John Lombardo – 12-string and bass guitar, vocal, producer
Mary Ramsey – vocal, viola, violin, Hammond organ

Additional musicians
Robert Buck – electric lead guitar
Stan Barton – mandolin
Andrew Case – drums
Joanne Ramsey – background vocal
Jerome Augustyniak – drums
Scott Miller – electric guitar solo
Bob Wiseman – accordion, piano, Hammond organ
Mary Margaret O'Hara – background vocal
Alex Chilton – electric lead guitar, vocal
Martin Simpson – acoustic lead guitar 
Joe Rozler – Hammond organ, piano
David Kane – piano, Hammond organ
Bryan Eckenrode – (with Natalie Soil cello trio)
Alfred B. Frenning – (with Natalie Soil cello trio, string arrangement)
Robbie Hausmann – (with Natalie Soil cello trio)

Technical staff
Armand John Petri – producer, engineer, mixing
Toby Mountain – mastering

References

John & Mary albums
1993 albums
Rykodisc albums